Andrena nasuta is a species of insect belonging to the family Andrenidae.

It is native to Central Europe and Western Asia.

References

nasuta